The Rev. Canon Henry Thomas Bowlby, M.A., (1864–1940) was an English cleric and headmaster of the English public school Lancing College, 1909–25.

Life
He was the son of Henry Bond Bowlby, Bishop Suffragan of Coventry. He was educated at Charterhouse School and was an Exhibitioner of Balliol College, Oxford. A member of Oxford University Athletics Club 1884–87, he was its president in 1886.

An Assistant Master at Eton College 1887–1909, Bowlby then became headmaster of Lancing. He was succeeded there by Cuthbert Harold Blakiston. He was a Canon of Chichester Cathedral 1925–30.

Bowlby died 7 February 1940.

Family
He was father of Capt. Henry Russell Bowlby, also a Master at Lancing.

References

1864 births
1940 deaths
People educated at Charterhouse School
Alumni of Balliol College, Oxford
Head Masters of Lancing College
20th-century English Anglican priests
Teachers at Eton College